Lanak La or Lanak Pass is a mountain pass in the disputed Aksai Chin region, administered by China as part of the Tibet Autonomous Region. It is claimed by India as its border pass.

History 

Lanak La had been a well-established frontier point between Ladakh and Tibet, as confirmed by travellers from William Moorcroft in 1820 onwards. Several travellers wrote in the late 19th and early 20th centuries that the traditional boundary between India and Tibet was at Lanak La. They also state that the border was accepted by both sides.

There are substantial Kashmiri Government records for the area of the Chang Chenmo valley up to the Lanak pass. In addition to the revenue records, 1908 Ladakh Settlement Report, reports of several survey teams, the Jammu and Kashmir Game Preservation Act of 1951, there are Kashmiri documents relating to the construction and maintenance of trade routes, rest houses, and storehouses in the Chang Chenmo valley. All of them placed the entire valley up to the Lanak Pass within Ladakh.

Chinese claims

Chinese maps also recognised Lanak La as the boundary till 1951.
In 1956, the People's Republic of China published what appears to be its first self-defined map, in which Kongka Pass was marked as the boundary.

There was no Chinese presence in the area of Lanak La till June 1958, when an Indian patrol party had gone up to it along the Changchenmo Valley.
There was an Indian flag planted there until 1956.

In the following year, Chinese troops had infiltrated into the Changchenmo Valley. In October 1959, as an Indian border patrol party was attempting to set up posts in the vicinity of the Kongka Pass, they were ambushed by Chinese troops, killing some of them and taking others prisoner.

Some western scholars such as Larry Wortzel and Allen S. Whiting  appear to endorse the Chinese claim that Kongka Pass was the "traditional" boundary of Tibet. Other scholars however point out the Chinese inconsistencies.

Historical maps

See also
 List of locations in Aksai Chin

References

Bibliography

External links
 Chang Chenmo River marked on OpenStreetMap

Mountain passes of China
Mountain passes of Tibet
Ngari Prefecture
Chang Chenmo Valley
Borders of Ladakh
Aksai Chin